The Dauphin River (Saint Lucia) is a river in Gros Islet Quarter, Saint Lucia.

See also
List of rivers of Saint Lucia

References
 

Rivers of Saint Lucia